Gavyn Matthew Bailey (born May 29, 1998) is an American singer, songwriter, producer, and podcast host. He entered the music industry with his first EP, Sickly in Love, in 2013. Bailey has had music featured on MTV's Degrassi and FreeForm's Party of Five (2020 TV series). Bailey is also a published songwriter, signed by Adam Anders and Alan Melina to Bump Into Genius and Warner/Chappell Music. He is a co-writer of "Ville Ønske Jeg Havde Kendt Dig" performed by Emil, which came in third place at the 2020 Dansk Melodi Grand Prix. In January 2021, Bailey co-founded "And That's That On That," an entertainment podcast, with Haley Chapman, which debuted in the Top 50 Music Interview Charts on Apple Podcasts.

Discography
EPs
 Sickly in Love (2013)

Singles
 Change Your Mind (2020)
 Grass Is Never Greener (2020)
 Numb Me, Bad (2019)
 No Space (2019)
 Fragile (2015)

Songwriting discography

Personal life
Bailey was born with kidney failure and received a life-saving kidney transplant on Easter Sunday, 2001. He has also been open about his past and present life with mental illness as an ambassador for Children's Hospital of Orange County's Mental Health Initiative.

References 

1998 births
Living people
21st-century American singers
Singers from California
Songwriters from California
People from Laguna Niguel, California
Kidney transplant recipients